Unfaithful may refer to:
 Someone who is infidel
 Someone who acts infidelity

Film and television
 Unfaithful (1918 film), a silent short film directed by Thomas H. Ince and Charles Miller
 Unfaithful (1931 film), directed by John Cromwell
 The Unfaithful (1947 film), a film noir
 The Unfaithful (1953 film), a Mexican drama film
 Unfaithful (2002 film), a 2002 film starring Diane Lane and Richard Gere
 "Unfaithful" (House), a 2009 episode of House

Music
 "Unfaithful" (song), a 2006 song by Rihanna
 "Unfaithful", a 2009 song by Stornoway
"Los Infieles" (English: "The Unfaithful"), a song by Aventura

See also
 Faithless (disambiguation)
 Faithful (disambiguation)
 Faith (disambiguation)